The Women's 500m Time Trial was one of the 6 women's events at the 2002 UCI Track Cycling World Championships, held in Copenhagen, Denmark.

18 Cyclists from 14 countries were due to participate in the race. The Final was held on September 26.

World record

Final

References

Women's 500 m time trial
UCI Track Cycling World Championships – Women's 500 m time trial
UCI